Germany competed at the 2022 World Aquatics Championships in Budapest, Hungary from 18 June to 3 July.

Medalists

Artistic swimming 

Women

Diving 

Men

Women

Mixed

Open water swimming 

 Men

 Women

 Mixed

Swimming 

 Men

 Women

Mixed

 Legend: (*) = Swimmers who participated in the heat only.

Water polo 

Summary

Men's tournament

Team roster

Group play

13–15th place semifinals

13th place game

References 

Nations at the 2022 World Aquatics Championships
World Aquatics Championships
2022